William Andrew Beer (1862-1954) was an English artist, known for painting racing pigeons, in oil on canvas, under the working name of Andrew Beer. A racing pigeon enthusiast himself, he was a judge at competitive pigeon shows.

Beer had a studio in Eastville, Bristol, to which the pigeons he was to paint were sometimes sent by train, arriving at the nearby Stapleton Road Station. He typically painted pigeons at near life-size, singly or in small groups, in side-on view, against similar backgrounds. He often included text, noting the pigeons' names and achievements.

His works are in the collections of Bristol Museum & Art Gallery, Pontypridd Museum and the Radstock, Midsomer Norton & District Museum Society.

He also painted scenes of southern England, which were issued as postcards.

References

External links 

 

1862 births
1954 deaths
19th-century English painters
English male painters
20th-century English painters
Pigeon racing
Artists from Bristol
Postcard artists
19th-century English male artists
20th-century English male artists